Sears, Roebuck & Co. v. Stiffel Co., 376 U.S. 225 (1964), was a United States Supreme Court case which limited state law on unfair competition when it prevents the copying of an item that is not covered by a patent.

Justice Hugo Black wrote for a unanimous Court that the Constitution reserved power over intellectual property such as patents to the federal government exclusively. Since the trial court had found Stiffel's patent invalid as insufficiently inventive, its product design was thus in the public domain and no state law could be used to prevent Sears from copying it.

The Supreme Court made a similar ruling in a companion case decided the same day, Compco Corp. v. Day-Brite Lighting, Inc..

These two cases were the first decisions of the Supreme Court that states could not, because of the Supremacy Clause of the Constitution, create their own patent or patent-like laws. The issue had been raised, but not decided, in Gibbons v. Ogden, in which Attorney General Wirt argued on behalf of the United States for federal patent preemption of New York's grant of a steamboat patent to Robert Fulton.

Background

Stiffel Co. was a lamp manufacturer that had created a "pole lamp", which was a vertical tube standing upright between the floor and ceiling of a room, and with lamp fixtures along the outside of the tube.  Stiffel Co. had secured a mechanical patent and a design patent, granted in 1957, on the pole lamp, and the lamp proved a "decided commercial success," according to the Supreme Court's opinion.

Soon after Stiffel brought the pole lamp to market, the Sears, Roebuck & Co. department store put on the market copies of the lamp. Stiffel Co. brought suit against Sears, for patent infringement and for unfair competition under Illinois law, the latter claim based on Sears' allegedly causing confusion in the trade as to the source of the lamps.

The United States District Court for the Northern District of Illinois, held the patents invalid for "want of invention," but ruled Sears to be guilty of unfair competition because the lamps were "confusingly similar," enjoined Sears from selling the identical lamps, and ordered an award of monetary damages to Stiffel Co.

The United States Court of Appeals for the Seventh Circuit affirmed, holding that under Illinois law, Stiffel had only to prove that there was a "likelihood of confusion as to the source of the products" due to the identical appearance of the lamps.  The U.S. Supreme Court granted certiorari to consider whether this use of a state's unfair competition law was compatible with U.S. patent law.

Ruling of Supreme Court

Justice Black, in the Court's opinion, reviewed the history of the patent monopoly in English and U.S. law, and wrote that when a patent expires, or when an item is unpatentable, then the item "is in the public domain and may be made and sold by whoever chooses to do so.". The lower courts had erred by using Illinois unfair competition law to effectively give Stiffel Co. a patent monopoly on its unpatented lamp.

The Court continued that "mere inability of the public to tell two identical articles apart is not enough to support an injunction against copying or an award of damages for copying that which the federal patent laws permit to be copied," though it noted that a state could require that goods be labeled in order to prevent consumers from being misled as to the source of an article; but that this was a trade dress issue, and that such state laws could not go so far as to prohibit the copying of the goods themselves: "What Sears did was to copy Stiffel's design and to sell lamps almost identical to those sold by Stiffel. This it had every right to do under the federal patent laws. That Stiffel originated the pole lamp and made it popular is immaterial."

Justice Harlan concurred in the result but opined that states should be able to prohibit copying if the main purpose of the prohibition is to prevent "palming off" one company's goods as those of another.

Subsequent events

Stiffel was reaffirmed in Bonito Boats, Inc. v. Thunder Craft Boats, Inc.

Stiffel Co. survived the setback of its loss in this case, continuing in business until 2000.  At that point, it failed, after 68 years in business. It was described as "the last full-line cast zinc lamp maker in the United States." However, Stiffel Lamps appears to be doing business as recently as April 20, 2021 with the website http://stiffel.com/, where it reports to have been founded in 1932.

A Symposium issue of the Columbia Law Review, Product Simulation: A Right or a Wrong, 64  1178 (1964) was published containing articles on Sears and Compco after "the Editors of the Columbia Law Review [] invited several eminent scholars to comment upon the opinions."

Stiffel is widely cited for preemption of state product protection by the federal patent laws.

References

Further reading

James M. Treece, Patent Policy and Preemption: The Stiffel and Compco Cases, 32  80 (1964).
Symposium issue of Columbia Law Review: Product Simulation: A Right or a Wrong, 64  1178 (1964) (articles about case by Daphne R. Leeds, Milton Handler, Walter J. Derenberg, Ralph S. Brown, Jr., and Paul Bender).

External links
 

1964 in United States case law
Sears Holdings
United States patent case law
United States Supreme Court cases
United States Supreme Court cases of the Warren Court
United States Supreme Court decisions that overrule a prior Supreme Court decision